Barnham Cross Common is a  biological Site of Special Scientific Interest on the southern outskirts of Thetford in Norfolk. It is owned by Thetford Town Council and is registered common land. It is also a Local Nature Reserve and a Nature Conservation Review site, Grade 1. It is part of the Breckland Special Area of Conservation and Special Protection Area.

This grassland and heath common has diverse habitats and a rich flora, including several nationally rare plants. There are nearly a hundred species of birds, including sixty which breed on the site, and a wide range of invertebrates.

The common is open to the public.

References

Sites of Special Scientific Interest in Norfolk
Local Nature Reserves in Norfolk
Special Protection Areas in England
Special Areas of Conservation in England
Nature Conservation Review sites